Socialist Convergence of Catalonia (in Catalan: Convèrgencia Socialista de Catalunya, CSC) was a political party in Catalonia, Spain. CSC was founded in 1974 as from a split of the Socialist Movement of Catalonia (MSC).

Its secretary general was Joan Reventós. The party participated in the unitary organizations of the antifascist opposition in Catalonia, expecting to join forces with other social-democratic and socialist parties.

In 1976 CSC merged with other groups and parties to form the Socialist Party of Catalonia-Congress.

See also
Socialists' Party of Catalonia
Socialist Party of Catalonia–Congress
Socialist Party of Catalonia–Regrouping
Catalan Federation of the PSOE
Unified Socialist Party of Catalonia
List of political parties in Catalonia

References

Political parties in Catalonia
Socialist parties in Catalonia
Socialist parties in Spain
Left-wing nationalist parties
Catalan nationalist parties
Anti-Francoism